Jung Yong-hwa is a South Korean musician, singer, songwriter, producer and actor. He is the leader, lead vocalist and rhythm guitarist of the rock band CNBLUE under FNC Entertainment.

CNBLUE Korean albums

CNBLUE Japanese albums

Solo albums

Other work

References 

Jung Yong-hwa
Jung, Yong-hwa
Jung, Yong-hwa